The 1970–71 BYU Cougars men's basketball team represented Brigham Young University in the 1970–71 college basketball season. This was head coach Stan Watts's 22nd season at BYU. The Cougars finished the regular season with a record of 18–11, 10–4 in the Western Athletic Conference.

Roster

Schedule

Team players drafted into the NBA

References 

BYU
BYU Cougars men's basketball seasons
BYU Basketball
BYU Basketball
BYU